Li Jingfang GCVO (李經方; 1854 – 28 September 1934), also known as Li Ching-fong, was a Chinese statesman during the Qing dynasty. Being the nephew and adopted son of the late statesman Li Hongzhang, he served in his adoptive father's secretariat in his youth. In 1882, Li Jingfang obtained the second highest degree in the imperial examinations and subsequently obtained appointment in the Qing foreign service because of his knowledge of English. In 1886–89, he worked as a secretary to the Qing legation in London and in 1890-92 he served as the Qing minister to Japan. He is mostly known for having signed the Sino-Japanese Treaty of Shimonoseki in Li Hongzhang's stead in 1895. He was appointed as an Honorary Knight Commander of the Royal Victorian Order by Queen Victoria in 1896 and was promoted to a Honorary Knight Grand Cross a few years later in 1909. He also served as the Chinese Minister to London in 1909–1910.

References

1854 births
1934 deaths
Qing dynasty politicians from Anhui
Politicians from Hefei
Ambassadors of China to Japan
Qing dynasty diplomats
Businesspeople from Anhui
Ambassadors of China to the United Kingdom
Honorary Knights Grand Cross of the Royal Victorian Order